Jan Leszczyński (20 October 1946 – 13 January 2004) was a Polish footballer. He played in one match for the Poland national football team in 1968.

References

External links
 

1946 births
2004 deaths
Polish footballers
Poland international footballers
Place of birth missing
Association footballers not categorized by position